Pyramidoptera is a genus of flowering plants belonging to the family Apiaceae. Its only species is Pyramidoptera cabulica. Its native range is Afghanistan.

References

Apioideae
Monotypic Apioideae genera